The Greek Local Statutes were the local assemblies of Greece (the Charter of the Senate of Western Continental Greece, the Legal Order of Eastern Continental Greece, the Peloponnesian Senate Organization, the Provisional Regime of Crete, and the Military-Political Organization of the Island of Samos) during the Greek War of Independence who codified certain 'proto-constitutions' ratified by local assemblies with the aim of eventually establishing a centralized Parliament under a single constitution.

Political institutions of the Greek War of Independence
Political history of Greece